Wansheng District is a former district of Chongqing Municipality, China.

In October 2011, Wansheng was merged into the much poorer Qijiang County to form the new Qijiang District.

Wansheng is a popular tourist destination in Chongqing, attracting tourists to natural attractions such as the Black Valley and Wansheng stone forest. The stone forest of Wansheng is the second largest in China. Before the development of tourism, Wansheng was a major coal producing area, with up to half of coal mined in Chongqing being mined in Wansheng.

Climate

References

Districts of Chongqing